Pascal Moraguès is a French clarinetist. Moragues has been the principal clarinetist of the Orchestre de Paris since 1981. He has been a professor at the Conservatoire de Paris since 1995 and a guest professor at the Superior College of Music in Osaka since 2002.

Discography
Messiaen: Quatuor Pour La Fin Du Temps, Thème Et Variations, with the Wanderer Trio. Harmonia Mundi, 2008.
Brahms: String Quartet Op 51, Clarinet Quintet Op. 115, with the Prazak String Quartet. Praga, 2006.
MOZART, with Quintette Moragues. Euravent, 1992.

References

French classical clarinetists
20th-century French musicians
Academic staff of the Conservatoire de Paris
1963 births
Living people
21st-century clarinetists